XHMA-FM is a radio station on 101.1 FM in Guadalajara, Jalisco, Mexico. The station is owned by MVS Radio and carries the Exa FM national format.

History
XHMA received its first concession on November 10, 1969. It was owned by Manuel Ayala Estrada until 1975, when the concession was transferred to XHMA-FM Estereo Latino, S.A., the owner of Núcleo Radio Guadalajara.

References

Radio stations in Guadalajara
Radio stations established in 1969
MVS Radio